Savino may refer to:
Savino (surname)

Given name 
Savino Pezzotta (born 1943), Italian trade unionist and politician
Savino Guglielmetti (1911–2006), Italian gymnast
Savino Bellini (1913–1974), Italian footballer
Savino Bernardo Maria Cazzaro Bertollo (1924–2017)
Savino Bratton, a character from the television drama The Wire

Places 
Savino, Russia, name of several inhabited localities in Russia
Bolshoye Savino Airport, Russia
Bolshoye Savino, Russia
Lupche-Savino  River
Lake Lupche-Savino, Russia
Savino Selo (literally Savino village), Serbia
Costa San Savino, Italy
Monte San Savino, Italy

See also
, Italian comune
Saint-Savin (disambiguation)
A.C. Sansovino